President is a steamboat that currently lies dismantled in Effingham, Illinois. Originally named Cincinnati, it was built in 1924 and is the only remaining "Western Rivers" style sidewheel river excursion steamboat in the United States.  She was listed on the National Register of Historic Places and declared a National Historic Landmark in 1989, although these designations were revoked in 2011. Her home ports have been Cincinnati, Ohio; New Orleans, Louisiana; Vicksburg, Mississippi; St. Louis, Missouri; and Davenport, Iowa.

History
Built in 1924 by the Midland Barge Company for John W. Hubbard of Pittsburgh and then known as Cincinnati, she was originally planned as an overnight packet boat which carried passengers and freight from Cincinnati, Ohio, to Louisville, Kentucky during the summer. Once the hull was in Cincinnati, the owners expanded the passenger capacity by building two cabin-decks. The operators, Louisville & Cincinnati Packet Company, ran excursions, making its maiden voyage downstream to New Orleans for Mardi Gras in 1924. They operated Mardi Gras excursions for consecutive years through 1930. Sometimes Cincinnati cruised upriver into the Pittsburgh area.

Streckfus Steamers acquired the Cincinnati in 1933 and stripped it down to its hull. They refitted the hull with 24 watertight compartments, then built five decks encased within an all-steel superstructure. The company moved her to her new home port of St. Louis, Missouri, where she served the upscale excursion market. Renamed as President, the newly renovated 285-foot sidewheeler could accommodate 3,000 passengers and the ballroom could host 1,000 dancers. The cabins were built with an open design and the lido was built without a Texas deck.

Newly converted and newly named, she opened for business in 1934. Streckfus advertised her as "the New 5 Deck Luxury Super Steamer, Biggest and Finest On The Upper Mississippi". She continued tramping (having no fixed schedule or published ports of call) until 1941. (In 1940, she was displaced from her position as flagship of the Streckfus line by the S.S. Admiral.)

In 1941, she switched her home port to New Orleans. Because fuel oil was restricted and many of the young crewmen joined the armed forces with the nation's entry into World War II, tramping was discontinued, and the cruises stayed close to home. After the war, President remained in New Orleans for many years as a popular music venue, featuring concerts by national acts such as U2, Cyndi Lauper, Men at Work, The Little River Band, and The Producers, and performances by New Orleans artists like Dr. John, The Neville Brothers, and The Cold. She was also seen in the 1958 Elvis Presley film, King Creole, featured prominently during the opening credits but with the larger displayed name repainted near the sidewheel to read SS New Orleans, as well as in the final scenes of the 1973 Sergio Leone western "My Name is Nobody" cruising up river.

Because the wind made maneuvering the big boat difficult, she had her two side wheels removed and replaced by  diesel engines in 1978.

She was sold and returned to St. Louis sometime after October 1987 as her new home port. While there, she was listed on the National Register of Historic Places and designated a National Historic Landmark on Dec. 20, 1989.

On July 27, 2011, the Department of the Interior issued a press release that included the following line; "Finally, President, a steamboat in St. Elmo, Illinois, had its designation as a National Historic Landmark withdrawn because of a loss of historic integrity." The ship was also removed from the National Register entirely.

Casino
In 1990, President sailed her last dinner and dancing cruise before undergoing a ten million dollar renovation and conversion into a floating casino. She was purchased by what is now known as Isle of Capri Casinos. She was the second riverboat casino in the United States in modern times (opening 30 minutes after the first riverboat casino the M/V Diamond Lady opened in Bettendorf, Iowa, which was owned by Bernie Goldstein).

Current status
President retired from service in 1999 and was reported, in 2004, to be located on the Yazoo River in Mississippi. At that time, she was for sale by Isle of Capri Casinos. She was also located for a time at Treasure Island in Lake McKellar at Memphis, Tennessee.

In January 2009, President was located in Alton, Illinois, where she had been listed by the National Park Service as of November 2007. She was disassembled and moved in pieces to St. Elmo, Illinois, near Effingham. Although local businesspeople hope to re-assemble her as a non-floating tourist attraction and hotel, financing has yet to be secured.

See also
List of U.S. National Historic Landmark ships, shipwrecks, and shipyards

References

External links

 Steamboats.org entry
 
 Presidents Last Location on Wikimapia

Former National Historic Landmarks of the United States
Steamboats of the Mississippi River
1924 ships
Former National Register of Historic Places in Illinois
Paddle steamers of the United States
Casinos in the United States
Riverboat casinos